Ian Christopher Stanley (born 28 February 1957) is a British musician, songwriter and record producer. He was previously a member of the English band Tears for Fears for most of the 1980s, and played a key role in the making of their multi-platinum selling second studio album Songs from the Big Chair.

Biography

Career
After offering them free use of his recording facility, Stanley became a member of Tears for Fears, contributing on synthesizers, drum machines, organ, pianos and backing vocals on their first three albums. He also co-wrote (with Roland Orzabal) many of their songs from the period 1983–1985, and was a part of the production team during this era as the band worked with producer Chris Hughes at their studio, The Wool Hall, in Bath.

He has appeared in several Tears for Fears music videos, including Change (in which he plays one of the two masked musicians), Mothers Talk (version 1 & 3), Shout, Everybody Wants to Rule the World, Head over Heels and I Believe, and has performed with the band on many television performances. He also appeared in the 1983 Tears for Fears live video In My Mind's Eye, and the 1985 Tears for Fears documentary film Scenes from the Big Chair, as well as completing two world tours with the band.

Post-Tears for Fears and production
Following the success of Songs from the Big Chair, Stanley collaborated with Roland Orzabal on the 1986 side project Mancrab, releasing a single, "Fish for Life", which was made for the soundtrack of the film The Karate Kid Part II. Stanley also began working on Tears for Fears' third album, The Seeds of Love, but (along with producer Chris Hughes) left the project due to creative differences. His more prominent contributions to this album, however, can be heard on the hit single "Sowing the Seeds of Love" and the B-sides "Always in the Past" and "My Life in the Suicide Ranks".

Since the 1980s, Stanley has produced such artists as Lloyd Cole and the Commotions, A-ha, The Pretenders, Howard Jones, Ultra, Republica, Naimee Coleman, Stephanie Kirkham, Natalie Imbruglia, Propaganda, The Human League and Tori Amos. He also contributed to The Sisters of Mercy re-recording of Temple of Love and additional production on Under The Gun. Stanley also did A&R for Warners East West Records but left in 1998.

Stanley's most recent work was producing The Beautiful South's album Superbi (2006), in part at his Irish studio in Enniskerry, County Wicklow.

References

External links

1957 births
Living people
English keyboardists
English new wave musicians
Tears for Fears members
English record producers
English songwriters
People from High Wycombe